Danny Dunn and the Heat Ray is the seventh novel in the Danny Dunn series of juvenile science fiction/adventure books written by Raymond Abrashkin and Jay Williams. The book was first published in 1962.

Plot introduction 
Danny finds and uses a heat ray which Professor Bullfinch has created for the government.

Editions 
McGraw-Hill
 (Paperback, 1962, illustrated by Owen Kampen)
 (Hardback, 1962, illustrated by Owen Kampen)

MacDonald and Jane's
 (Hardback, 1973, illustrated by Anne Mieke)

Pocket Books/Archway Books
 (Paperback, 1979, #14 in their series, illustrated by Owen Kampen)
 (Paperback, 1983 reissue, illustrated by Owen Kampen)

Danny Dunn
1962 American novels
1962 children's books
1962 science fiction novels